Brain Dead is a Malaysian heavy metal band, which originated from Taiping, Perak, Malaysia, and formed in 1988. Brain Dead consists of Ein, Malek, Hashim dan Lan "Bye".

Since its formation, Brain Dead has produced two demos, an album and a split album (with Silent Death). The band went in hiatus after the split-album since 1995. They have now re-activated their status since 2008 and has produced their second album in 2020.

History

1988/1989
Not many metal fans knew that Malaysia has their own rock and roll movement and has given birth to so many bands during the mid to the late 1970s. The most prominent were Singaporean rock pioneers, Sweet Charity and Kingdom of Rock which were able to record their own album in the late 1970s. At that time, there were no differences between Malaysian and Singaporean acts as both countries were neighbours and shared a lot of common things in term of culture and historical background. By the beginning of the 1980s, rock music got bigger and has been accepted more than before. This resulted to the emergence of many rock/heavy metal groups. Bands like Search, Lefthanded, Ella and The Boys, Rusty Blade, Bloodshed, D'Febian, Metallian, Burnmarks, Wings, Rockers, Crossfire and hundreds more marked their own way in local music industry. Sadly, none of them gained an international success as this is probably due to the lack of originalities where local bands were just imitating Iron Maiden, Loudness, Dio...etc. and furthermore, their album was written in Malay language.

Apart from the rockin' and rollin' development which was considered as 'heavy and exotic' musics in our country for that time, the birth of the fastest and latest brutal musical sensation in America and Europe, known as speed/thrash metal has also landed in Malaysia. The earliest heavy and extreme band was Blackfire from the north of Malaysia, formerly known as Metal Ghost playing hardrock/heavy metal in 1982 before morphing into Blackfire in 1984 and their music direction turned to black metal! Starting from 1987 to the late eighties, a lot of thrash band popping out such Punisher, Nemesis, Saxo, Picagari, Rator, Bacteria, Sil Khannaz, Brain Dead themselves and much more. They only doing cover songs from Venom, Metallica, Slayer, Megadeth, Metal Church, Anthrax, Destruction, Sodom, Kreator and others thrash masters. Brain Dead was one of those surviving eighties bands which was so lucky because got the opportunity to record album and play so many shows at their hometown and the capital city, Kuala Lumpur.

Brain Dead originated in north of Malaysia, within the state of Perak, in the district of Taiping by 31 August 1988. The band was formed by Ein Possessor, the frontman on guitar/vocal and Malek Mutilation, the other guitarist. Later, they were joined by bassist, Hashim Pestilence and completed by Shahrin, the drummer. The band's name was taken from Exodus' song title. During the early incarnation, they used to cover Metallica's first three albums. By the end of that year, they were introduced to the likes of Venom, Slayer, Sodom, Destruction, Possessed, Sepultura and later on worshipping more underground cults such Sarcofago, Slaughter, Morbid Angel...etc. Their first performance was at their hometown in early 1989 as a supporting act for a local hardrock/heavy metal band, M.A.Y., who has just release their second album. They played in front of 1,300 metal maniacs, gave them an unbelievable experience and got tremendous feedback too as they "killed 'em all" by doing all of Metallica's tunes!

After their first show, Brain Dead started to play in underground gigs locally and also in the earliest ones at Kuala Lumpur, playing together with other thrash/death metal acts such Slap Death, Bacteria, Nemesis, Glottis...etc. After playing in numerous shows, the quartet at the same time began to dig underground scene by writing to local and overseas band and fanzines. The following year, 1990, were spent by practicing and working on their own material under the new and heavy influence from Sepultura (early years), Sarcofago, M. Daud Kilau, Ahmad Jais, Ben Nathan,  Morbid Angel...etc. Their early writings were 'Eternal War', 'Satanism' and 'On Your Grave' which completely baptized them as a brutal death metal group and make them as one of Malaysia's premier extreme music outfit. Finally, the songs were recorded and released as their first demo entitled 'Eternal War' on 13 December 1990. The materials were one of the early demos from the Malaysian underground scene. Other local bands which issued demos at the same year were Suffocation (later renamed to Suffercation) with 'Nightmare in Red', Silent Death with 'Eternal Damnation', Sil Khannaz with 'Doctrine To Hell', Hijrah (later renamed to Pilgrims) with 'A Pilgrimage to Nowhere', Senseless Death with 'Terminal of Death' and prior to that in 1989, Rator ripping with 'Evil Symphony' and Cromok tearing the scene off with 'Image of Purity' demo tape.

1990/1991
Starting from the blasphemous demo, Brain Dead spread their name to local and
international underground scene through zine and compilation tapes. The tape didn't get much attention outside of the country, perhaps due to the bad sound and poor promotion. It's been a busy year for them, as they were playing gigs around with other extreme band from the same genre while meantime, the so-called 'heavy or brutal music' was getting bigger in the country. While playing at a local show called 'Super Thailand Festival' on 4 October 1991, these four death metallers took the opportunity to record the show, then by December 1991, two new songs, 'Repulse To Destruct' and 'Devourment of Gore' were recorded in studio. At the same time, they were also offered by a local rock record label, Noize Records, to participate in a death metal compilation together with Sil Khannaz, Suffercation, Silent Death and Picagari but the project never saw the light of day. Soon after the project failed, they decided to release a second demo with three live tracks taken from 'Super Thailand Festival' and the two new studio tracks. They simply named the demo 'Live Demo 1992' and it got more recognition and became of the most promising death metal splatter from Malaysia.

1992 to 1994
The year 1992 saw the unexpected decision taken by Brain Dead because they started to get bored with the current death metal boom which became so trendy and commercialized. After the mid of 1992, they began to seek something more original that could separate them from the typical death metal crap. The result is, they found a new path for their music and this new direction was still death metal but darker and blacker with a touch of doom and black metal. Labelling themselves as "dark occult metal horde" and this newly style began to cause minor differences within the band. Surprisingly, after the mid-1992, Nick Sia from a local extreme metal label, Dark Journey Records, offered them to record an album after being mesmerized by their demo. After a few meetings and infernal discussions, they agreed to sign with Dark Journey Records.

Brain Dead was planning to record the album in early 1993 but their record label suggests them to record the album for that year (1992). This led the band in a rush to start recording their first (and only) album. Then, the band faced something unexpected; Shahrin made a departure from the band due to personal commitments and obligations. With the remaining three piece line-up, the band continued with the recording plan. There's a minor changes in line up position however; Ein switched from guitars/vocals to bass/vocals, Malik retained his guitar duties while Hashim took over the drumming duty totally. With deadlines to meet, they familiarized their new roles the best as they can. They entered Digitron Studio in late 1992 to record an eight tracks album, showing their unique brand of occult, black and dark death metal which was actually a combination of their old and new influences such Venom, Mercyful Fate, Celtic Frost (early years), Sarcofago, Samael, Roots...etc. Finally, the curse of Brain Dead was unleashed upon mankind, namely 'From The Ectasy' in December 1992, earlier than their previous plan.

Regarding to their first album, according to Ein, initially Brain Dead was planning to add some keyboards, effects and intro/outro for the album for a more atmospherically touch of pure darkness! But the saddest thing was, they were never allowed to do that because Dark Journey Records wanted to cut costs. They were the third death metal band to record an album after Suffercation's 'Day of Darkness' and Silent Death's 'Before The Sunrise' were recorded in the very same year. They aggressively promoted the album by annihilating as many stage shows as they could and by doing interviews for both local and international zines. In early 1993, they participated in compilation album called 'Dark Live Collection' together with Silent Death, Nemesis, Catarrh, Nebiras and Tormentor. Two new hellish tracks were recorded, 'The 7th Winds' and 'Spirit of Heloisa' where it's still in the dark vein of 'From The Ecstasy'. These two songs were also released in form of a promo tape and has been spread mostly for overseas.

This time, Ein get back to his position as guitar/vocal and for Malik or Hashim, still playing their weapons but for bass player, Adik, bassist/vocalist from Necrotic Chaos (ex-Glottis) was invited to filled the pie as sessionist. At the meantime, Ein also fronting his other black/death metal band project, Narraka (Hell) with three other mayhemic legions since 1990. Undeniably, he's one of the mainman for Narraka but the band was inactive because of Ein's involvement in Brain Dead. Narraka try so many times to record their merciless anthems but never saw the light of the metallic day! In 1994, Dark Journey Records without permission, rereleasing half of the album in form of split tape with Silent Death entitled 'Dead and Death' and it's not a bootleg but clearly a rip off! This bring the band in conflict with their label and they decide to leave Dark Journey for an uncertain future.

1995/1996
In 1995 the band facing up the most difficult situation as Malik moved to other state, Mallaca, Hashim residing at Kuala Lumpur and Adik decided to fully concentrated on Necrotic Chaos for their upcoming devastation demos and such. This make the band in the limbonic black years and Ein took this opportunity to reactivate Narraka under a new moniker, Heloisa! Brain Dead however, played their last gig ever in Pulau Pinang in 1995 with original line-up as an honour or 'farewell show' to their loyal fans. After the demise of Brain Dead, Hashim joined Sil Khannaz as bassist, Malik hang off his guitar, while Ein giving his full demonic force to Heloisa, start to play local gigs and soon in late 1996, Nebiula Productions, another Malaysian extreme metal label, offered them for an album and the result is their debut full length, 'Mirror of Trinity' in 1997.

1997 to 2005
When local organizers doing tribute gigs to metal gods as Venom, Slayer, Metallica and
Celtic Frost, Brain Dead joined one of the shows somewhere in 1997. This is just to pay tribute and honour to bands that inspired them during the formative years. In the early year of 2000, Orgamastron Productions, a Malaysian label, release a tribute album for them titled 'In Remembrance For Brain Dead' with limited edition. A unique combination of Malaysian and Singaporean metal/hardcore bands took part and the label exclusively launched the album by doing a special reunion gigs for them, together with bands featured. Then Brain Dead and Heloisa dwells in a silent moment but still receiving offers to do a reunion gigs but the band always being rejective because unable to give a full commitment.

After Brain Dead breaking up, Hashim continues playing bass for many bands and as for Shahrin, giving his energy to various metal dan punk acts while Ein, joining a new band from their hometown, Hatred. He's actually just a session member for this speed/thrash cover bands by having fun with Sodom, Slayer or Exodus tunes. This was around 2005 and besides Ein, there's also other session and original member from Heloisa and Maze Torment playing for Hatred but when the band went into the studio to record debut demo, Ein and a few other leave the band. After leaving Hatred, Ein tries to reform Brain Dead but due to their circumstances, his barbaric intent wasn't going nowhere until early 2008.

2008 to present
Brain Dead reunited with original line-up and only added one new member which is their old time friends, Lan "Bye" (ex-Infectious Maggots/Sil Khannaz), played two gigs in March and November 2008.

Discography
Studio albums
 To The Infamy (2020)
 From The Ecstasy (1992)

Demo
 Eternal War (1990)
 Live (1992)
 Promo (1993)

Compilation album
 In Remembrance to Brain Dead (1999)

Split album
 Death and Dead (1994)

Band members

Current Members
 Ein Possessor – vocals & guitar (1988 to present) (Heloisa)
 Malek – guitar (1988 to present)
 Hashim Pestilence – bass (1988 to present) (Sil Khannaz, The Pilgrims, FTG)
Lan "Bye" – drum (2008 to present)

Past Members
 Shahrin – drum (1988–2008) (Nemesis)
 Adik – bass (1992) (Necrotic Chaos)

External links
 http://www.myspace.com/fromtheecstasy
 https://web.archive.org/web/20090624140146/http://www.muzikrock.com/brain_dead_01.html
 http://www.thegauntlet.com/bio/1896/Brain-Dead-%28Mys%29.html
 https://web.archive.org/web/20110727141327/http://mentharas.ods.org/modules.php?name=News&file=print&sid=226

Malaysian thrash metal musical groups
Musical groups established in 1988
Malaysian death metal musical groups